TLN-Europa, Ltd., is a Croatian independent record label and a film and video production company based in Zagreb. It's founded by Davor Sučić, better known as Sejo Sexon, a Bosnian rock and roll musician and a bandleader of Zabranjeno pušenje.

Released albums

Zabranjeno pušenje 
 Nikad robom, vazda taxijem (1996)
 Srce, ruke i lopata (1998)
 Agent tajne sile (1999)
 Male priče o velikoj ljubavi (1999, original release in 1989)
 Bog vozi Mercedes (2001)

Elvis J. Kurtović 
 Sve najbolje od... - Hitovi '83-'88 (1996)

External links 
 TLN-Europa at Discogs
 Photo studio Fotić Vila

References

Croatian record labels
Record labels established in 1995
Companies based in Zagreb
Film production companies of Croatia
Mass media companies established in 1995